is a Japanese former footballer. She played for Japan national team. Her brother Genki Nagasato and sister Yuki Nagasato are footballers.

Club career
Nagasato was born in Atsugi on January 24, 1989. She joined Nippon TV Beleza from youth team in 2007. In 2012 season, she was selected Best Eleven. In 2013, she moved to German Bundesliga club Turbine Potsdam. In 2016, she retired.

National team career
In November 2008, Nagasato was selected Japan U-20 national team for 2008 U-20 World Cup. She scored two goals including a winner against Germany.
On July 29, 2009, Asano Nagasato debuted for Japan national team against Germany. She was a member of Japan for 2015 World Cup. She played 11 games and scored 1 goals for Japan until 2015.

National team statistics

References

External links

Japan Football Association

1989 births
Living people
Japan Women's College of Physical Education alumni
People from Atsugi, Kanagawa
Association football people from Kanagawa Prefecture
Japanese women's footballers
Japan women's international footballers
Nadeshiko League players
Nippon TV Tokyo Verdy Beleza players
1. FFC Turbine Potsdam players
Japanese expatriate footballers
Expatriate women's footballers in Germany
Japanese expatriate sportspeople in Germany
2015 FIFA Women's World Cup players
Women's association football forwards